"We Can Fly" is a single by the progressive rock band Yes released in 2011, and consisting of shortened versions of two sections of the suite "Fly from Here" from their album of the same name: "Fly from Here, Part I: We Can Fly" and "Fly from Here, Part V: We Can Fly (Reprise)".

It is the first single by Yes since "If Only You Knew" (from The Ladder), released in 1999. It is also the only Yes single with Benoît David on vocals, and the second after "Into the Lens" in 1980 without Jon Anderson on vocals and with Geoff Downes on keyboards.

Music video
The official music video was released on 3 July 2011. The video portrays the story of an airline passenger awaiting his flight, who reads a magazine article about a 1940s Hollywood mogul who died in a plane crash as a result of a "pilot error." The man finishes reading, runs down a flight of stairs, and boards his plane only to find the same '40s-era cast of characters aboard, with a stewardess leading him to the cockpit to pilot the plane. Trevor Horn makes a cameo appearance as the movie mogul.

Jon Anderson's reaction
In an interview with Rolling Stone, Anderson stated that on hearing "We Can Fly" he felt it sounded "a bit dated" and that Trevor Horn's production "wasn't as good as I expected". He did, however, praise David's vocal performance.

Personnel 
Yes
 Benoît David – lead vocals
 Chris Squire – bass, backing vocals
 Steve Howe – guitars, backing vocals
 Geoff Downes – keyboards
 Alan White – drums

Additional musicians
 Oliver Wakeman – additional keyboards

Release history

References

External links

Yes (band) songs
The Buggles songs
2011 songs
Song recordings produced by Trevor Horn
Songs written by Geoff Downes
Songs written by Trevor Horn
Songs written by Chris Squire